ADCC  may refer to:
Antibody-dependent cell-mediated cytotoxicity
Air Defence Cadet Corps, an organisation in Britain from 1938 to 1941
Abu Dhabi Combat Club Submission Fighting World Championship
Adenoid cystic carcinoma, a rare type of cancer